The golden-collared honeycreeper (Iridophanes pulcherrimus) is an uncommon species of Neotropical bird in the tanager family Thraupidae. It is the only member of the genus Iridophanes.

It is found in Colombia, Ecuador, and Peru. Its natural habitats are subtropical or tropical moist montane forests and heavily degraded former forest.

Taxonomy
The golden-collared honeycreeper was formally described in 1853 by the English zoologist Philip Sclater from a specimen collected near Bogotá in Colombia. He coined the binomial name Tangara pulcherrima. It is now the only species placed in the genus Iridophanes that was erected by Robert Ridgway in 1901. The genus name Iridophanes combines the Ancient Greek iris meaning "rainbow" and -phanēs  meaning "showing". The specific epithet pulcherrimus is Latin for "very beautiful".

A molecular phylogenetic study of the tanager family published in 2014 found that the golden-collared honeycreeper and the green honeycreeper (Chlorophanes spiza) were sister species.

Two subspecies are recognised:
 I. p. pulcherrimus (Sclater, PL, 1853) – central Colombia through east Ecuador to south-central Peru
 I. p. aureinucha (Ridgway, 1879) – west Colombia to northwest Ecuador

References

External links
 Xeno-canto: audio recordings of the golden-collared honeycreeper

golden-collared honeycreeper
Birds of the Colombian Andes
Birds of the Ecuadorian Andes
Birds of the Peruvian Andes
golden-collared honeycreeper
golden-collared honeycreeper
Taxonomy articles created by Polbot